Athletics at the 1980 Summer Olympics was represented by 38 events. They were held in the Grand Arena of the Central Lenin Stadium at Luzhniki (south-western part of Moscow) between July 24 and August 1. There were a total number of 959 participating athletes from 70 countries.

Medal table

Medal summary

Men

Women

Controversy
Polish gold medallist pole vaulter Władysław Kozakiewicz showed an obscene bras d'honneur gesture in all four directions to the jeering Soviet public, causing an international scandal and almost losing his medal as a result.  There were numerous incidents and accusations of Soviet officials using their authority to negate marks by opponents to the point that IAAF officials found the need to look over the officials' shoulders to try to keep the events fair.  There were also accusations of opening stadium gates to advantage Soviet athletes, and causing other disturbances to opposing athletes.

The Soviet Union's Jaak Uudmäe and Viktor Saneyev won the first two places in the triple jump, ahead of Brazil's world record holder João Carlos de Oliveira. Both de Oliveira and Australia's Ian Campbell produced long jumps, but they were declared fouls by the officials and not measured; in Campbell's case, his longest jump was ruled a "scrape foul", with his trailing leg touching the track during the jump. Campbell insisted he hadn't scraped, and it was alleged the officials intentionally threw out his and de Oliveira's best jumps to favor the Soviets, similarly to a number of other events.  Similar allegations were made about a favorable call aiding Tatyana Kolpakova in the women's long jump.

See also
 1980 World Championships in Athletics
 1980 in athletics (track and field)

References

External links
 International Olympic Committee results database
 Athletics Australia

 
1980 Summer Olympics events
O
1980
1980 Olympics
1980 Olympics